Anjukandy Thalakkal Ummer (10 March 1933 – 18 October 2001) was a Malayalam music composer from Kerala, India. He is known for composing many soft melodies for 174 Malayalam movies.

Born in Anjukandy in Kannur district on 10 March 1933, as the son of A. T. Moideen Kunhi and Sainaba, Ummer made his debut in the 1967 film Thalirukkal. In 1969 he composed songs for the film Almaram, directed by A. Vincent. Two years later, Ummer composed music for Vincent's musical film Abhijathyam.

In the 1970s, Ummer teamed up with lyricist Bichu Thirumala, producing numerous evergreen songs. He also made tunes for lyrics by P. Bhaskaran and O. N. V. Kurup, along others. Most of his songs were sung by K. J. Yesudas and S. Janaki. 

In 1976, he won the Kerala State Film Award for the best music director for the I. V. Sasi directed film Aalinganam. The melancholic song "Thushaara bindhukkale" from the same movie earned S. Janaki the Kerala State Film Award for the best female singer.
He composed many popular songs including 'Oru mayil peeliyay njan', 'Neela jalashayathil', 'Marivill panthalitta', 'Devi nin chiriyil', 'Vakappoo maram choodum', 'Chemapakappoonkavanathile', 'Ninnepunaran neettiya kaikalil', 'Vrishchika rathri than', 'Pottikkaranjukondomane', 'Thushara bindukkale', 'Unni aarariro' and 'Oru nimisham tharoo'. He died at his home in Chennai aged 68 on 18 October 2001, after suffering from Parkinson's disease and lung cancer. His dead body was taken back to his native place Kannur, and was buried there. He is survived by his wife Hafsath, whom he married in 1978, and a son named Amar Elahi.

Filmography

The list of few films that songs composed  by A.T.Ummer in Malayalam

1977 Aadhya Paadam
1979 Aavesham 
1980 Karimpana 
1981 Ahimsa 
1982 Ina 
1982 Thadakam 
1982 Raktha Sakshi 
1982 Mukhangal 
1983 Oru Mukham Pala Mukham 
1984 Paavam Krooran 
1984 Oru Kochukatha Aarum Parayatha Katha 
1984 Lakshmana Rekha 
1985 Naayakan 
1985 Janakeeya Kodathi 
1986 T.P. Balagopalan M.A. 
1988 Simon Peter Ninakku Vendi 
1991 Ganamela

Music department (3 credits) 
 1978 Soothrakkari (musical director)
 1982 Mukhangal (musical director) 
 1983 Eettillam (musical director)

References

External links
 
 AT Ummer at MSI

Indian male composers
Malayalam film score composers
Indian Muslims
Film musicians from Kerala
Kerala State Film Award winners
Musicians from Kannur
1933 births
2001 deaths
20th-century Indian composers
Male film score composers
20th-century male musicians
Deaths from Parkinson's disease